Live It Up! is Holly Woods's final album. It was recorded in 1986 after Toronto's label, Solid Gold Records, went into receivership forcing the band to split up.

Two of the members, Holly Woods and Scott Kreyer, regrouped and continued on to a studio in Atlanta to record new tracks with producer Sonny Limbo. The tapes were shelved for over twenty years due to the preceding reputation of Solid Gold Records and subsequent death of Limbo.

Track listing
 "Live It Up!"
 "Only for the Moment"
 "Until We Change"
 "Win"
 "Where Are We Now"
 "Hold On"
 "The Fall"
 "Shimmy Shake"

Musicians
Holly Woods - lead vocals
Scott Kreyer - keyboards, backing vocals
(various session musicians)

References

External links
MySpace Page
Cyclone Records

1985 albums
Toronto (band) albums